Germansen Landing is an unincorporated settlement on the Omineca River, at the confluence of that river and its tributary the Germansen, in the Northern Interior of British Columbia, Canada.  The settlement was a focus of the Omineca Gold Rush of the 1860s.

Climate

References

Unincorporated settlements in British Columbia
Northern Interior of British Columbia
Omineca Mountains
Omineca Country
British Columbia gold rushes